Pretham is a 2016 Indian Malayalam-language comedy horror drama film, written, co-produced and directed by Ranjith Sankar. Starring Jayasurya, Aju Varghese, Govind Padmasoorya, Sharaf U Dheen, Shruthi Ramachandran, Pearle Maaney, Dharmajan Bolgatty, and Hareesh Peradi in the prominent roles. It is co-produced by Sankar and Jayasurya. The film was a commercial  success and in 2018 a sequel, Pretham 2 was released.

It was remade in Telugu under the title Raju Gari Gadhi 2. It is also the third collaboration of Sankar and Jayasurya after Punyalan Agarbattis and Su.. Su... Sudhi Vathmeekam. Principal photography began in Cherai, Ernakulam on 24 May 2016. The film was released on 12 August 2016. A sequel titled Pretham 2 was released in 2018.

Plot 
Three young men — Denny Kokken (Aju Varghese), Priyalal (Sharaf U Dheen), and Shibu Majeed (Govind Padmasoorya) have been friends since college. Together, they work till they hit their 30s and start their own business that they can enjoy in a semi-retired manner. They get together and invest all their money in a resort in Kerala. However, their happy beginning is thwarted by paranormal activities and they approach John Don Bosco (Jayasurya), a psychic who works as a mentalist in cruise ships and entertainment industry. John Don Bosco also assists the police as a human lie detector with his cold reading techniques.

John informs the three hoteliers that their resort is haunted by a ghost who is seeking answers as to who killed her, why was she killed and what did they gain from her death. Through his investigations John reveals that the ghost is of Clara who was a bright and intelligent student from National Law College. Amrita (The college principal's daughter) was jealous of Clara's popularity and the fondness of her father towards Clara. Amrita secretly films Clara's nude scenes while bathing (in the same resort owned by the three hoteliers) and leaks it online. Unable to bear the shame, Clara commits suicide. John brings justice to Clara by answering her questions. He asks Amrita to see Clara by touching his hand. She falls down in shock, cringing away from the ghost glaring at her. This proves her guilt beyond any doubts.

Cast 
Jayasurya as John Don Bosco, a Mentalist
Aju Varghese as Denny Kokken
Govind Padmasoorya as Shibu 
Sharaf U Dheen as Priyalal
Sharanya Menon as Amritha
Shruthi Ramachandran as Clara (Spirit)
Pearle Maaney as Suhaanisa
Dharmajan Bolgatty as Yeshu
Sunil Sukhada 
Sathi Premji as Mary a.k.a. Dakini
Hareesh Peradi as Priest
Devan as Principal of National Law College
Vijay Babu as Comm.Akash Kurien
Nyla Usha as Maya Thomas
Arya Rohit as Shalini
Biyon as Tony
Sini Abraham as Lecture of National Law College

Production 
In 2000, Ranjith Sankar wrote the script for the TV serial, Nizhalukal, "probably the first horror serial" to premiere on Malayalam television. Citing it as an inspiration for the film, he said, "(I) have thought of umpteen subjects to explore the genre in movies all these years before arriving on this. Pretham is a horror comedy," on his Facebook profile.

Jayasurya played a Mentalist named John Don Bosco alongside Shruthi Ramachandran and Pearle Maaney. Initially Mamta Mohandas was considered for the lead role but didn't materialize. Justin Jose, known for his work in the Telugu film Baahubali: The Beginning and the Bollywood film Bajrangi Bhaijaan, did the sound design. The filming began on 24 May 2016 in the small town in Cherai in Ernakulam.

Music 
Music: Anand MadhusoodananLyrics: Rafeeq Ahamed.

Single

 Oruthikku Pinnil - Vineeth Sreenivasan

Release 
Pretham was released on 12 August 2016.

Box office 
There was over 40% hike in collection from day 1 to day 2 at the Indian box office. The film grossed 6.7 crore in 3 days run. It remained in more than 185 screens in Kerala in its third week. The film grossed 18 crore in 23 days at the Indian box office. The film collected $4,650 from UK box office. The film collected  from USA box office in its third weekend. The film was commercial success.

Sequel 

Sequel of the film was titled Pretham 2. It was released on 21 December 2018 during Christmas season.

References

External links 
 

Indian comedy horror films
Films set in Kerala
2010s Malayalam-language films
Films shot in Kochi
Malayalam films remade in other languages
2016 comedy horror films
Films directed by Ranjith Sankar
Malayalam films in series